Allas is a surname. Notable people with the surname include:

 (born 1950), Swedish politician
Teet Allas (born 1977), Estonian footballer
Yasmine Allas (born 1967), Somali-Dutch actress and writer

See also
Alla (surname)
Allas Sea Pool
Hallas